Sloanella is a genus of beetles in the family Carabidae, containing the following species:

 Sloanella gordoni Eberhard & Giachino, 2011
 Sloanella obscura Moore, 1983
 Sloanella pallida Moore, 1972
 Sloanella simsoni (Blackburn, 1894)
 Sloanella suavis Moore, 1972

References

Trechinae